The Badgujar / Bargujar / Badgurjar is a clan of Rajputs.

History 

The Bargujars ruled over Rajorgarh, Dausa, Deoti and Ghasira, Macheri. They were expelled from Dausa, Rajorgarh and Deoti by Kachhwaha Rajputs when they migrated to Dhundhar, in 11th century Rao Dula Rai, won the areas of Dausa and Deoti from the Badgujar Rajputs, who were reduced to feudatory or jagirdars. In 18th century Surajmal with the help of Mughal wazir took the Bargujar stronghold of Ghasera from its ruler  Bahadur Singh Badgurjar  which was again recovered by Bahadur Singh's son with the help of Imad ul MulK.

Princely State & Jagirs controlled by Bargujars

Other places once controlled by Badgujars were Kamalpur, and Barauli Rao.

Heritage
The Ghasera Fort and Khandar Fort are among the two major forts built by Bargujar Rajput rulers.

Distribution
They are mainly distributed parts of present-day Rajasthan, Uttar Pradesh and Madhya Pradesh.

Notable people
 Raja Pratap Singh Badgujar
 Raja Anup singh Badgujar
 Raj Kunwar Singh
 Muhammad Ahmad Said Khan Chhatari

See also

 Lalkhani

References

 
Rajput clans of Uttar Pradesh
Rajput clans of Rajasthan
Muslim communities of India
Rajput clans of Madhya Pradesh